Trust Me may refer to:

Film and television

Film
 Trust Me (1989 film), an American crime film by Robert Houston
 Trust Me (2007 film), a British comedy by Andrew Kazamia
 Trust Me (2010 film), a Swedish comedy-drama by Johan Kling
 Trust Me (2013 film), an American comedy-drama by Clark Gregg
 Trust Me, a 2020 film by Roko Belic

Television

Series
 Trust Me (American TV series), a 2009 drama series
 Trust Me (British TV series), a 2017–2019 anthology medical drama series

Episodes
 "Trust Me" (Alias), 2002
 "Trust Me" (The Americans), 2013
 "Trust Me" (Burn Notice), 2008
 "Trust Me" (Damages), 2009
 "Trust Me" (Once Upon a Time in Wonderland), 2013

Literature
 Trust Me (short story collection), a 1987 book by John Updike
 Trust Me (novel), a 2006 Indian chick lit novel by Rajashree
 Trust Me, a novel by Peter Leonard
 Trust Me: Charles Keating and the Missing Billions, a 1988 book by Charles Bowden and Michael Binstein

Music

Albums
 Trust Me (Craig David album), 2007
 Trust Me (Yōko Oginome album), 1991
 Trust Me, by Jean Carn, 1982
 Trust Me, an EP by Robyn and Mr. Tophat, 2017

Songs
 "Trust Me" (Akina Nakamori song), 1999
 "Trust Me" (I'm Talking song), 1984
 "Trust Me" (Pandora song), 1993
 "Trust Me", by A1 from Rediscovered, 2012
 "Trust Me", by Backstreet Boys from In a World Like This, 2013
 "Trust Me", by Bhad Bhabie featuring Ty Dolla Sign from 15, 2018
 "Trust Me", by Chris Brown from Heartbreak on a Full Moon, 2019
 "Trust Me", by Don Xhoni, 2021
 "Trust Me", by the Fray from How to Save a Life, 2005
 "Trust Me", by Guru from Guru's Jazzmatazz, Vol. 1, 1993
 "Trust Me", by Swans from Children of God, 1987
 "Trust Me (Midzy)", by Itzy, 2021

Other uses
 Trust Me, a 2017 comedy album by Kurt Braunohler
 Experto crede, a Latin motto sometimes translated as "trust me"

See also